Henry de Ardagh   was appointed Dean of Armagh in 1262 and served until 1272.

References

Deans of Armagh
13th-century Irish Roman Catholic priests